The Rencontres Économiques d'Aix-en-Provence is an economic forum organized by Le Cercle des économistes since 2001, in the city of Aix-en-Provence, France.

Organization 
Free and public, this forum brings together business leaders, academics, international organizations, NGOs, politicians and students for three days of discussion.

Les Rencontres Économiques d’Aix-en-Provence has as its goal to vitalize economic debate at the French, European and international levels. Organized each year around an economic and social theme, these three days of discussion aspire not only to contribute to a better public understanding of economic problems, but also to identify which policy alternatives should best be put into effect. Les Rencontres are also an exercise in intellectual exploration culminating at the end of the conference in a joint public statement by the members of Le Cercle des économistes.

The sessions and debates can be followed on the official website of les Rencontres Économiques d'Aix-en-Provence and then on its YouTube channel. Each year, over a hundred journalists from a dozen countries cover the event.

Activities

Participants 

Since its creation, many personalities have participated to the Rencontres Économiques d'Aix-en-Provence. Among them:

- Academics:  Olivier Blanchard, Suzanne Berger, Claudia-Maria Buch, Esther Duflo, Barry Eichengreen, Eugène Fama, Robert Fogel, Francis Fukuyama, Roberto Lavagna, Robert Merton, Dani Rodrik, Kenneth Rogoff, Nouriel Roubini, Peter Sloterdijk, Joseph Stiglitz, Laura Tyson, Cédric Villani, Zhu Min.

- Institutional bodies:  justice Breyer, Mario Draghi, José Ángel Gurría, Christine Lagarde, Pascal Lamy, Cecilia Malmström, Pierre Moscovici, Jean-Claude Trichet.

- Politics:  Madeleine Albright, Jörg Asmussen, Laurent Fabius, Elsa Fornero, Valéry Giscard d'Estaing, Alain Juppé, Bruno le Maire, Emmanuel Macron, David Miliband, Mario Monti, Ngozi Okonjo-Iweala, Ana Palacio, Edouard Philippe, Hery Rajaonarimampianina, Macky Sall, Tharman Shanmugaratnam, Paul Wolfowitz, Ernesto Zedillo, Martin Ziguélé.

- Companies: Patricia Barbizet, Emmanuel Faber, Carlos Ghosn, Paul Hermelin, Philipp Hildebrand, Isabelle Kocher, Anne Lauvergeon, Jean-Marc Ollagnier, Patrick Pouyanné, Stéphane Richard, Tidjane Thiam, Hal Varian.

- Civil society: Luc Besson, Sharon Burrow, Reza Deghati, Yu Hua, Francis Huster, Étienne Klein, Mo Ibrahim, Thierry Marx, Erik Orsenna, Thomas Pesquet, Bertrand Piccard, Abderrahmane Sissako.

Previous editions 

 The 22nd edition "Successfully transforming the world" was held from 5 to 7 July 2022
The 21st edition "Seize the future, together" was held from 2 to 4 July 2021 
The 20th edition "Acting in the face of disruptions in the world - We will get through this!" was held from 3 to 5 July 2020.
The 19th edition "(???)" was held from 5 to 7 July 2019.
 The 18th edition "The World's Metamorphoses" was held from 6 to 8 July 2018
The 17th edition "In Search of New Forms of Prosperity" was held from 7 to 9 July 2017 
The 16th edition "In a World of Turmoil, What is a Nation for?" was held from 1 to 3 July 2016.
The 15th edition "What if Work Were the Key?" was held from 3 to 5 July 2015.
The 14th edition "Invest and Invent Tomorrow" was held from 4 to 6 July 2014.
 The 13th edition "The Clash of Times : The World Economy, between Emergencies and the Long Term" was held from 5 to 7 July 2013.
 The 12th edition "What if the Sun also Rises in the West... The new Global dynamics" was held from 6 to 8 July 2012.
 The 11th edition "The States of the World" was held from 8 to 10 July 2011.
 The 10th edition "In search of new growth" from 2 to 4 July 2010.
 The 9th edition "Growth, demography, finance:from major economic breakdowns to new balances" was held from 3 to 5 July 2009.
 The 8th edition "Firms: the new frontiers" was held the 4 to 6 July 2008.
 The 7th edition "Which Capitalisms for the XXIth Century ?" was held from 6 to 8 July 2007. 
 The 6th edition "A World of scarce resources : “Is World economic growth in jeopardy ?” was held from 7 to 9 July 2006.
 The 5th edition "The United States and Europe" was held from 8 to 10 July 2005.
 The 4th edition "European Companies in the global competition" was held from 9 to 11 July 2004. 
 The 3rd edition "Europe, a new world economy" was held from 4 to 6 July 2003.
 The 2nd edition "Europe and the world governance" was held from 5 to 7 July 2002.
 The 1st edition "Is the European construction running out of steam ?" was held from 15 to 16 July 2001.

See also 
 Cercle des économistes

References 

 Claire Gatinois et Marie de Vergès "Les Rencontres d'Aix, un "mini-Davos" estival" Le Monde, 4 July 2014, retrieved on 30 October 2014.
 Liz Alderman Europeans Fear France Could Threaten Recovery, The New York Times, 6 July 2014, retrieved on 30 October 2014

External links 
 

20th-century economic history
21st-century economic history
Global economic conferences